The 1920 United States presidential election in California took place on November 2, 1920, as part of the 1920 United States presidential election in which all 48 states participated. California voters chose 13 electors to represent them in the Electoral College via a popular vote pitting Democratic nominee, Governor James M. Cox of Ohio and his running mate, Assistant Secretary of the Navy Franklin D. Roosevelt of New York, against Republican challenger U.S. Senator Warren G. Harding of Ohio and his running mate, Governor Calvin Coolidge of Massachusetts.

By the beginning of 1920 skyrocketing inflation and President Woodrow Wilson's focus upon his proposed League of Nations at the expense of domestic policy had helped make the incumbent President very unpopular – besides which Wilson also had major health problems that had left First Lady Edith Wilson effectively running the nation.

Political unrest observed in the Palmer Raids and the "Red Scare" further added to the unpopularity of the Democratic Party, since this global political turmoil produced considerable fear of alien revolutionaries invading the country. Demand in the West for exclusion of Asian immigrants became even stronger than it had been before. Another issue was the anti-Cox position taken by the Ku Klux Klan, at the time a dominant force in Southern Democratic politics, and Cox's inconsistent stance on newly passed Prohibition – he had been a "wet" before, but announced he would support Prohibition enforcement in August.

The West had been the chief presidential battleground ever since the "System of 1896" emerged following that election. For this reason, Cox chose to tour the entire nation and after touring the Pacific Northwest Cox went to California to defend his proposed League of Nations. Cox argued that the League could have stopped the Asian conflicts – like the Japanese seizure of Shandong – but his apparent defence of Chinese immigrants in the Bay Area was very unpopular and large numbers of hecklers attacked the Democratic candidate. Moreover, the only attention Cox received in the Western press was severe criticism.

In September, several opinion polls were conducted, all predicting that Harding would carry California, which had been extremely close in the two preceding elections, by over one hundred thousand votes. By the end of October, although no more opinion polls had been published, most observers were even more convinced that the Republicans would take complete control of all branches of government. On election day, Warren Harding carried California by a margin much larger than early polls predicted, winning with 66.20 percent of the vote to James Cox's 24.28 percent. Harding became the first of only two presidential nominees to sweep all of California's counties; the only other one was Franklin D. Roosevelt, the losing 1920 vice-presidential candidate, sixteen years later. Harding's 66.20 percent of the vote was the largest fraction for any presidential candidate in California until Roosevelt won with 66.95 percent in 1936, though his 41.92-percentage-point margin of victory is the largest for any candidate in the state.

This was the first time Mariposa County and Colusa County, the only counties in the Pacific States to support Democratic nominee Alton B. Parker in 1904, had ever voted Republican. Plumas County would never vote Republican again until Ronald Reagan in 1980, and Amador, El Dorado and Placer Counties would not vote Republican again until Dwight D. Eisenhower in 1952.

Results

Results by county

References

1920 California elections
California
1920